It was a Dacian fortified town.

References

External links
Cetatea dacica de la Ardeu
Cetatea Ardeu, jud. Hunedoara

3D reconstruction
 „Cetățuia Ardeu” - Dacian Fortress, 3D virtual reconstruction (hypothetical) (v.1)

Dacian fortresses in Hunedoara County
Historic monuments in Hunedoara County